Belt is a town in Cascade County, Montana, United States. The population was 510 according to the 2020 census. It is part of the Great Falls, Montana metropolitan area.

History
Belt was home to Montana's first coal mine. It supplied fuel to Fort Benton. The post office opened on February 2, 1885, with Eugene Clingan as postmaster.

Geography
Belt is located at  (47.385935, -110.926587). U.S. Route 89 connects to Montana Secondary Highway 331 at the town. Belt Creek flows through town.

The town was named for Belt Butte, a nearby mountain which has a dark layer resembling a belt.

Climate
According to the Köppen Climate Classification system, Belt has a semi-arid climate, abbreviated "BSk" on climate maps.

Demographics

2010 census
As of the census of 2010, there were 597 people, 261 households, and 159 families living in the town. The racial makeup of the town was 95.5% White, 1.7% Native American, 0.5% Asian, 0.2% from other races, and 2.2% from two or more races. Hispanic or Latino of any race were 1.0% of the population.

There were 261 households, of which 29.1% had children under the age of 18 living with them, 47.5% were married couples living together, 10.7% had a female householder with no husband present, 2.7% had a male householder with no wife present, and 39.1% were non-families. 33.0% of all households were made up of individuals, and 13.7% had someone living alone who was 65 years of age or older. The average household size was 2.29 and the average family size was 2.92.

The median age in the town was 43.4 years. 23.8% of residents were under the age of 18; 7.6% were between the ages of 18 and 24; 20.4% were from 25 to 44; 30.4% were from 45 to 64; and 18.1% were 65 years of age or older. The gender makeup of the town was 50.1% male and 49.9% female.

2000 census
As of the census of 2000, there were 666 people, 273 households, and 168 families living in the city. The population density was 1,877.0 people per square mile (718.8/km2). There were 295 housing units at an average density of 874.7 per square mile (335.0/km2). The racial makeup of the city was 94.94% White, 1.42% African American, 1.42% Native American, 0.32% Pacific Islander, 0.16% from other races, and 1.74% from two or more races. Hispanic or Latino of any race were 1.11% of the population.

There were 273 households, out of which 28.9% had children under the age of 18 living with them, 49.1% were married couples living together, 8.8% had a female householder with no husband present, and 38.1% were non-families. 35.9% of all households were made up of individuals, and 18.7% had someone living alone who was 65 years of age or older. The average household size was 2.32 and the average family size was 3.03.

In the city, the population was spread out, with 26.5% under the age of 18, 7.4% from 18 to 24, 25.9% from 25 to 44, 24.2% from 45 to 64, and 16.0% who were 65 years of age or older. The median age was 39 years. For every 100 females, there were 90.7 males. For every 100 females age 18 and over, there were 83.8 males.

The median income for a household in the city was $25,469, and the median income for a family was $30,104. Males had a median income of $21,477 versus $20,192 for females. The per capita income for the city was $14,970. About 10.2% of families and 12.9% of the population were below the poverty line, including 19.8% of those under age 18 and 16.5% of those age 65 or over.

Education
Belt Public Schools educates students from kindergarten through 12th grade. They are known as the Huskies. Belt High School is a Class C school.

Notable people
 James R. Browning, judge on the United States Court of Appeals for the Ninth Circuit
Matt Maki, Finnish-born master carpenter and builder of the 1890s

See also
List of cities and towns in Montana

References

External links
 Community website
 Belt Public Schools

Towns in Cascade County, Montana
Great Falls Metropolitan Area